Payne may refer to:

People
Payne (surname)

Organisations
Payne (company)

Places
United States
Payne, Georgia
Payne, Ohio
Payne County, Oklahoma
Payne's Prairie, Florida
Fort Payne, Alabama
Elsewhere
Payne Creek (disambiguation)
Payne Bluff above Sandon, British Columbia on the Kaslo and Slocan Railway

Entertainment
Major Payne, 1995 film
Martin Payne, main character in the Martin TV series
Max Payne (video game), computer game
Max Payne 2: The Fall of Max Payne, computer game
Max Payne 3, computer game
Max Payne (film), 2008 film
Payne (TV series), 1999 US TV show patterned after Fawlty Towers

Other uses
Payne Arena, an arena in Hidalgo, Texas
The Payne effect, the name of a particular feature of the stress-strain response of filled rubber
The Arnaud River, formerly "Payne River", in Nunavik, Canada
Payne rearrangement, isomerization reaction

See also
Paine (disambiguation)